John Merrell Peters (January 16, 1927 – February 4, 2013) was an American lawyer and legislator.

Born in Rochester, Minnesota, Peters grew up in DeWitt, Iowa. He served in the United States Navy during World War II. He received his bachelor's degree from the University of Iowa and his law degree from the University of Iowa College of Law. He practiced law in Fort Dodge, Iowa. He served in the Iowa House of Representatives in 1953-1955 as a Republican.

References

External links

Representative John Peters official Iowa General Assembly site

1927 births
2013 deaths
People from DeWitt, Iowa
Politicians from Fort Dodge, Iowa
Politicians from Rochester, Minnesota
Iowa State University alumni
University of Iowa College of Law alumni
Iowa lawyers
Republican Party members of the Iowa House of Representatives
20th-century American lawyers